Thomas Patrick Hunt (born 31 August 1988) is a British politician who has served as the Member of Parliament (MP) for Ipswich since 2019. He is a member of the Conservative Party.

Earlier in his career, he was a councillor on East Cambridgeshire District Council from 2011 to 2017. Following the Cambridgeshire and Peterborough devolution deal, Hunt also worked as chief of staff to the elected Mayor of Cambridgeshire and Peterborough.

Early life 
Hunt was born and raised in Ely, Cambridgeshire. His father is a long-serving councillor on Cambridgeshire County Council and East Cambridgeshire District Council. Hunt attended The King's School, Ely and Hills Road Sixth Form College in Cambridge. He went on to study Politics and Modern History at the University of Manchester and an MSc at Pembroke College, Oxford.

Political career

Local and regional government 
In 2011, Hunt was elected as a district councillor for Ely South on East Cambridgeshire District Council, serving until 2017. He was head of media for the Countryside Alliance.

After working as a parliamentary assistant for Oliver Dowden MP, Hunt worked as chief of staff to the Mayor of Cambridgeshire and Peterborough, James Palmer. In July 2020, a government minister, Simon Clarke, criticised the appointment, saying that the legal advice behind it "contained significant omissions".

2017 general election

In the 2017 general election, Hunt stood as the Conservative candidate in the Doncaster Central constituency, but lost to Rosie Winterton.

2019 general election 
Hunt was selected as the Conservative parliamentary candidate for Ipswich by the local Conservative Association in September 2018. He had few previous connections to the town.

During the run up to the 2019 general election, Hunt said he would prioritise more investment in public services in Suffolk. This was to include more funding for Suffolk Constabulary to tackle county lines gangs and knife crime. He stated that Ipswich had not had a fair deal regarding police funding, and also called for tougher sentencing for those found guilty of serious crime.

Hunt has also stated that he wanted infrastructure upgrades. He has expressed his support for an Ipswich northern bypass, a solution to closures of Orwell Bridge due to high winds, in addition to better and more reliable rail services.

He was elected as the Member of Parliament for Ipswich on 12 December 2019, defeating the incumbent Labour MP Sandy Martin. He received 24,952 votes, a 50.3% vote share. Hunt identified Brexit and the unpopularity of Labour leader Jeremy Corbyn as issues behind the Conservatives' victory in Ipswich. He said being elected to represent Ipswich was the greatest honour of his life.

Member of Parliament for Ipswich 

One of Hunt's first actions after becoming an MP was to join the European Research Group, a eurosceptic group of MPs.
After his election to Parliament in 2019, Hunt said his priorities for Ipswich included combatting anti-social behaviour, ensuring good hospital and GP services in the constituency, and seeking greater investment in roads and the rail network in Suffolk.

In his maiden speech, Hunt said that he had been diagnosed with dyslexia and dyspraxia. He favours support for children with special educational needs.

In January 2020, Hunt wrote in an article for the local East Anglian Daily Times newspaper on crime and anti-social behaviour in Ipswich stating "It is impossible to start thinking about remedies to these issues without also being ready to confront the possibility that a disproportionate number of crimes are committed by individuals from certain communities. This is something we should be open and honest about. Brushing it under the carpet will not get us closer to solving the issue." The Ipswich and Suffolk Council for Racial Equality called his comments "at best disappointing and at worst an ill-judged piece of dogwhistling." Conservative Police and Crime Commissioner, Tim Passmore, referred to them as "very unhelpful".

During November 2020 he joined the COVID Recovery Group and abstained in the vote for a second lockdown.

Following an interim report on the connections between colonialism and properties now in the care of the National Trust, including links with historic slavery, Hunt was among the signatories of a letter to The Daily Telegraph in November 2020 from the "Common Sense Group" of Conservative Parliamentarians. The letter accused the National Trust of being "coloured by cultural Marxist dogma, colloquially known as the 'woke agenda'". He has also said that Historic England are "waging a war against our heritage", and considers their approach to explaining slavery at their sites as "Maoist and dystopian".

On 16 March 2021, Hunt denied claims made by Labour councillors that he had refused to meet with front-line workers with Hunt saying that this was due to earlier disputes with TUC members.
In April 2021, Hunt called for the flying of the Union Jack to be made compulsory in all schools, stating on Twitter that "If any pupils and teachers have concerns about this then surely they can be "educated" about what the flag actually represents". He was criticised for this by many social media users.

In January 2022, Hunt reacted to the clearing of the four people charged with the toppling of the Statue of Edward Colston by telling The Daily Telegraph "If you've broken the law and committed criminal damage you should be punished. If the jury is a barrier to ensuring they are punished then that needs to be addressed".

In April 2022, after Prime Minister Boris Johnson and Chancellor of the Exchequer Rishi Sunak were fined for breaking Covid rules during the 'Partygate' scandal, Hunt said that he believed they did not break the law and the decision to fine them was 'a bit harsh'.

References

External links

Alumni of the University of Manchester
Alumni of the University of Oxford
Conservative Party (UK) MPs for English constituencies
Living people
Members of the Parliament of the United Kingdom for Ipswich
People from Ely, Cambridgeshire
Politicians with dyslexia
UK MPs 2019–present
1988 births
People educated at King's Ely